The Big Easy Casino, formerly known as Mardi Gras Casino and Hollywood Greyhound Track, is a casino and formerly a greyhound racing facility located in Hallandale Beach, in the Florida, US. The casino features over 700 slot machines, virtual table games, free to enter poker tournaments and nightly entertainment.

History

What is now the Big Easy Casino opened as the Hollywood Kennel Club on December 1, 1934, three years after Florida legalized parimutuel betting. A grandstand was added in 1940. In 1974, the facility was reopened as Hollywood Greyhound Track.

A November 2004 statewide referendum allowed Broward County voters to decide whether to allow slot machines at parimutuel facilities located in the county. Broward County voters subsequently approved the use of slots at Hollywood Greyhound and other parimutuels.

An extensive renovation project in 2006 added approximately 1,100 slot machines and a poker room to the dog track, which was renamed Mardi Gras Casino. Two years later, an additional 200 slot machines were added and, in 2009, the Big Easy Poker Room was relocated and expanded.  Also included in the renovated facility were a flea market, several restaurants/bars, and a gift shop.

In 2015, the casino made further improvements, which included widening the aisles and opening up Louie's Lounge to the entire casino floor.

In 2017, the facility was closed for two months because of damage from Hurricane Irma.

In 2018, Jeffrey Soffer, owner of the Fontainebleau Hotel, purchased the Mardi Gras Casino from Hartman & Tyner, and renamed it as the Big Easy Casino.

Casino
The casino offers over 70,000 square feet of gaming space, including over 900 slot machines, virtual roulette and blackjack, as well as The Dog Pound, Mardi Gras’ smoker-friendly slot area; simulcast and greyhound racing.

The Big Easy Poker Room, offers over 30 tables of Texas Hold 'em, 7 Card Stud, Omaha and Omaha Hi/Lo. The casino offers low and high limit tables in an effort to accommodate beginner and experienced players.

There are also nightly, free to enter poker tournaments that can be entered and tracked through the Bravo Poker Mobile App.

Krewe Club 
The Krewe Club is the casino's membership program. Anyone over 21 can become a Krewe Club member, and will receive $25 bonus play when signing up. The Krewe Club is a tiered membership program that includes purple, gold, black, and platinum levels. As club members play in the casino, they earn points that enable them to move up from purple, to gold, to black, and eventually to the invitation only platinum card. Each level gives the card-holder more exclusive benefits, ranging from free valet service to complimentary tickets to on-site concerts and events.

Greyhound racing

Despite improvements and enhancements over the years, the dog track itself remained relatively the same over the course of its use.  Track specifics included: 
 Track length: 1,372 feet
 Track width: 22 feet
 Length of stretch: 300 feet
 Composition: Sand and marl
 Timing: Hundredth of a second
 Courses: 550 yards, 660 yards and 770 yards

The last day of racing was May 5, 2018. The casino, which is a supporter of the Adopt-A-Greyhound program, still offers simulcast greyhound racing, harness and thoroughbred racing from tracks across the United States and Canada.

Notable races

The track is home to four stakes races:
 Mardi Gras Futurity.
 $75,000 Mardi Gras World Classic.
 $10,000 Joe Ryan Jr. Memorial.
 $50,000 American Derby.

2010 Stakes Schedule 

The $15,000 Mardi Gras Futurity
Qualifying Rounds Begin
January 13 & 16
Semi-Final Round
January 20
Championship
January 23, 2010

Winner: Ls Lafave

Time: 30:60

The $75,000 Mardi Gras World Classic
Qualifying Rounds Begin
March 10 & 13th
Semi-Final Rounds Begin
March 17 & 20th
Championship
March 26, 2010

Winner: Oya Tom Terrific

Time: 30:51

The $10,000 Joe Ryan, Jr. Memorial
Championship
April 2, 2010

Winner: Funnelling Money

Time: 30:16

The $30,000 Hollywoodian
Qualifying Rounds Begin
April 21 & 24th
Semi-Final Rounds Begin
April 28 & May 1
Championship
May 8, 2010

Winner: Crispins Place

Time: 37:55

Hollywood World Classic winners

Dining
Dining options at the facility offer a mix of Cajun and American cuisine, ranging from fast casual to upscale, including:

Trifecta Grille & Bar, serving everything from burgers and hot dogs to regional favorites like empanadas, taquitos and plantain chips. Trifecta has it all including draft beer now on tap and a full liquor bar.
Bonjour Cafe, featuring a wide variety of fresh-baked pastries and tempting desserts are complemented by all day breakfast bites and bistro style sandwiches.
Le Royale, an ample selection of delicious appetizers, bar bites, burgers, salads and steaks make this the perfect addition to our poker room to keep you in the game.
The French Quarter, which is the casino's signature restaurant. Enjoy our regional menu of salads, steaks and seafood. American fare with a touch of New Orleans.

Entertainment events 
The property has several entertainment venues that host nightly performances and year-round events, including concerts, stand-up comedy, dance competitions, and MMA fights.

See also
List of casinos in Florida

References

External links
 

1934 establishments in Florida
Casinos in Florida
Sports venues in Broward County, Florida
Tourist attractions in Broward County, Florida
Defunct greyhound racing venues in the United States
Hallandale Beach, Florida